Richard Pococke (19 November 1704 – 25 September 1765) was an English-born churchman, inveterate traveller and travel writer. He was the Bishop of Ossory (1756–65) and Meath (1765), both dioceses of the Church of Ireland. However, he is best known for his travel writings and diaries.

Biography
Pococke was born in Southampton and educated at Corpus Christi College, Oxford, receiving a Bachelor of Law degree. His father was the Reverend Richard Pococke and his mother was Elizabeth Milles, the daughter of Rev. Isaac Milles the younger, son of Rev. Isaac Milles (1638–1720). His parents were married on 26 April 1698. Pococke's uncle, Thomas Milles, was a professor of Greek. He was also distantly related to Edward Pococke, the English Orientalist and biblical scholar. Rev. Jeremiah II Milles (1714–1784) was a first cousin.

His family connections meant he advanced rapidly in the church, becoming vicar-general of the Diocese of Waterford and Lismore.

Travels in Europe (1733–34) and the Near East (1737–40)

Between 1733 and 1741 he undertook two Grand Tours with his cousin, Jeremiah Milles.  The first (1733–34) was to France and Italy and the second (1737) was to various European countries, then again Italy.  Milles was recalled in 1737 to attend his uncle, the Bishop of Waterford & Lismore, leaving Pococke to continue his major excursion to the Middle East. He returned via Italy in 1741, visiting the Alps on his way back to England by 1742. He was considered one of the first Alpine travellers. 

Detailed accounts of his travels survive in a collection of letters written to Pococke's mother and their mutual uncle, the Bishop, as well as in a number of note-books (British Library, Add. Ms. 19939, 15779, 22998, etc.). The earlier manuscripts, recently edited and published by Rachel Finnegan, include probably the most detailed description of Venice's "Marriage to the Sea" ceremony as well as precious information on contemporary music, especially opera.  

From 1737 to 1741 he visited the Middle East, visiting Egypt, Palestine, Lebanon & Syria, Asia Minor and Greece. These travels were later published in his Description of the East of 1743 and 1745, works which were praised by Edward Gibbon. The complete collection of correspondence written to his mother from his Eastern voyage is now in print (2013), thus completing the publication of all his known travels. Among other things, he was one of the European travellers to give an account of the origins of the medieval Arabic document, the Achtiname of Muhammad, which claims that Muhammad had personally confirmed a grant of protection and other privileges to the monks of Saint Catherine's Monastery in Egypt.

Irish tour (1747–60)
During the years 1747–60, Pococke made a number of tours around various parts of Ireland. The longest of these tours occurred in 1752, when he travelled to just over half of Ireland's counties. He kept a record of this tour, but did not publish it. It ended up in the library of Trinity College, Dublin. Eventually, in 1891, an edited edition of Pococke's 1752 tour was published by George Thomas Stokes.

Tours in Scotland  (1747, 1750, 1760) 
Pococke made three tours in Scotland.   The first two were quite short, the third in 1760 very extensive taking him as far north as Orkney. The first tour commenced on 27 September 1747 and finished on 26 October of the same year. During that month, he visited Edinburgh, Stirling, Glasgow and Ayr, returning to Ireland via Port Patrick. The second tour was very short of only a few days duration. He crossed from Carlisle on 16 July 1750, visiting Dumfries and Drumlanrig Castle before returning via Carlisle.

The third tour was far more extensive, lasting nearly five months (excepting 8 May to 22 May spent in the north of England). He crossed from Port Patrick on 30 April 1760, returning via Berwick on Tweed on 22 Sept of the same year. His itinerary took him in a clockwise circuit round most of Scotland, including Loch Lomond, Iona, Fort William, Inverness, the North West, Orkney, the North East, Perth, Fife and Edinburgh, finishing at Berwick on Tweed. 

His travels and observations were recorded in a series of letters to his mother and sister, these letters being subsequently edited by him and transcribed into four manuscript quarto volumes.  These were published for the first time by the Scottish History Society in 1887, this being the Society's first Volume.

Episcopal office and further travels
While known for this travels and travel writing, Pococke also seemed to have been a conscientious churchman: this despite the time he spent travelling, his privileged background and reasonable wealth, in an age when the Anglican church was under some criticism for its lax ways. 

He came from a family of Anglican clergymen, his father and grandfather both being vicars. He was also related to the Bishop of Waterford and Lismore in Ireland, his uncle Thomas Milles. Following his education at Corpus Christi College, Oxford, he was ordained in 1725, his uncle appointing him to the Precentorship of Lismore. Although he was English, his whole forty-year life of service to the church was spent in the Church of Ireland, eleven of them as a Bishop. He was in effect part of the Anglo-Irish social class.

In 1734 he was appointed Vicar-General of the Dioceses of Waterford and Lismore. The following year, 1744 he was made Precentor of Waterford. The Lord Lieutenant of Ireland, the Earl of Chesterfield, then promoted him in 1745 to the Archdeaconry of Dublin. In 1756 the Archdeacon received an important preferment when he was appointed as a Bishop, the Bishop of Ossory.  In 1765, having briefly been appointed the Bishop of Elphin, the Bishopric of Meath became vacant and Pococke was translated directly from Ossory to Meath in July. Sadly, he died three months later. DNB 1885 - 1900/Richard Pococke

He seemed to have enjoyed a reputation as a preacher. On his tours in Scotland, he visited many Episcopal (i.e., Anglican) congregations, and preached and confirmed in them all,‘Bishop Pococke was the only Bishop of the Church of England, since the Revolution, that preached and confirmed in Scotland when Episcopacy was there abolished. For in the summer of 1760, this prelate made a journey from Ireland to the north parts of it (Scotland). . . He preached and confirmed in the English Church in Elgin, and continued to do so in every other of that persuasion which he had occasion to be near, greatly regarded and esteemed by all ranks and degrees of people.’ The Cambridge Chronicle, October 5, 1765.He spent many of his later years in travel throughout Britain and Ireland, publishing accounts of many of his journeys. For example, during early 1751 he toured north east Lancashire visiting Clitheroe, and Whalley, amongst other places.   He died of apoplexy during a visitation at Charleville Castle, near Tullamore, County Offaly, Ireland, in 1765. On his death, many of his manuscripts were given to the British Library.

He was buried at Ardbraccan, County Meath, Ireland.

Works
 Works by Richard Pococke in Internet Archive
 A Description of the East and Some other Countries, Vol. I: Observations on Egypt, W. Boyer, London, 1743.
 A Description of the East and Some other Countries, Vol. II, W. Boyer, London, 1745 – divided into two parts:
 Part 1, Observations on Palæstina or the Holy Land, Syria, Mesopotamia, Cyprus, and Candia.
 Part 2, Observations on the islands of the Archipelago, Asia Minor, Thrace, Greece, and some other parts of Europe.
 Tours in Scotland, 1747, 1750, 1760 , Scottish History Society, Edinburgh 1887 (online via National Library of Scotland)
 The Travels through England of Dr. Richard Pococke, successively Bishop of Meath and of Ossory, During 1750, 1751, and Later Years (Camden Society, 1888, vol. 42)

Mrs Elizabeth Montagu's description
In a letter to Mrs. Donnellan dated Sandleford, 30 December 1750, Mrs. Montagu wrote:
... We have a loss in not having Dr. Pococke here this Christmas, as we expected. The conversation of a man of letters, and a traveller, is very agreeable in the country. Now I am out of the sphere of attraction of the great city of London, I am as well pleased to hear of some custom at Constantinople as of a new fashion in London; and the Nile is as much my thought as the Thames...

References

Footnotes

Sources

Notes and Queries. London, 1859.
Nichols, John. Literary Anecdotes of the Eighteenth Century. 6 vols. Vol. 2. London, 1812.
St. John, James Augustus. The Lives of Celebrated Travellers. 3 vols. Vol. 2. New York: Harper & Brothers, Publishers, 1859.
Ratliff, Brandie. "The monastery of Saint Catherine at Mount Sinai and the Christian communities of the Caliphate." Sinaiticus. The bulletin of the Saint Catherine Foundation (2008).
Stokes, George Thomas (ed.). Pococke's Tour in Ireland in 1752. Dublin: Hodges Figgis & Co., 1891.
Chrissochoidis, Ilias. "Musical References in Richard Pococke's Early Correspondence (1734–37)". Society for Eighteenth-Century Music Newsletter 17 (September 2010 – April 2011), 5.
Damiani, Anita. Enlightened Observers: British Travelers to the Near East, 1717–1850, American University of Beirut, 1979, pp. 70–104

External links

Google Book Search, A General Collection of the Best and Most Interesting Voyages and Travels in All Parts of the World: Many of which are Now First Translated Into English, 1811. The full text of Pococke's "A Description of the East and Some other Countries, Vol. II (1745)" p. 406 – p. 770
Google Book Search, A General Collection of the Best and Most Interesting Voyages and Travels in All Parts of the World: Many of which are Now First Translated Into English, 1814. The full text of Pococke's "A Description of the East and Some other Countries, Vol. I (1743)" p. 163 – p. 402
Letters from Abroad: The Grand Tour Correspondence of Richard Pococke and Jeremiah Milles. Volume 1, Letters from the Continent (1733–34). Finnegan, Rachel (Ed.), Published by Pococke Press, 2011; 
Letters from Abroad: The Grand Tour Correspondence of Richard Pococke and Jeremiah Milles. Volume 2, Letters from the Continent (1736–37). Finnegan, Rachel (Ed.), Published by Pococke Press, 2012;
Letters from Abroad: The Grand Tour Correspondence of Richard Pococke and Jeremiah Milles. Volume 3, Letters from the East(1737–41). Finnegan, Rachel (Ed.), Published by Pococke Press, 2013;

1704 births
1765 deaths
Clergy from Southampton
Anglican bishops of Ossory
Anglican bishops of Meath
English anthropologists
18th-century travel writers
British travel writers
Fellows of the Royal Society
Alumni of Corpus Christi College, Oxford
Writers from Southampton